Trichopilia suavis is a species of orchid found from Central America to Colombia. The plants will blossom in the seasons of Spring and Winter at intermediate warm temperatures. The flowers will be available in white, purple, green and red colors. 

suavis